The Ceylon Police Medal was awarded to police officers of the Ceylon Police Force, with two versions: for gallantry and for meritorious service. The number of medals for meritorious service was limited to a maximum of ten a year.

The medals were established in August 1950 to replace the Colonial Police Medal. They were themselves replaced by the Sri Lanka Police Weeratha Padakkama for gallantry and Sri Lanka Police Vishishta Seva Padakkama for meritorious service when Ceylon became a republic in 1972.

Circular and made of silver, the medals have the sovereign's effigy of the obverse, (George VI until 1953, then Elizabeth II). The reverse bears the image of an elephant with, above, the wording "Ceylon Police Service" and, below, either "For Gallantry" or "For Merit", as appropriate. The ribbon is suspended from a straight bar suspension, with awards for gallantry distinguished by two narrow red stripes in the ribbon design.

See also

 Ceylon Police Long Service Medal
 Awards and decorations of the Sri Lanka Police
 Sri Lanka Police Weeratha Padakkama
 Sri Lanka Police Vishishta Seva Padakkama

Footnotes

References

Sri Lanka Police
Sri Lankan Medals

Civil awards and decorations of Sri Lanka
Law enforcement awards and honors
Courage awards
Awards established in 1950
Awards disestablished in 1972